The 1993 Open 13 was a men's tennis tournament played on indoor carpet courts and held at the Palais des Sports de Marseille in Marseille, France. It was the inaugural edition of the tournament which was held from 1 February until 8 February 1993. Sixth-seeded Marc Rosset won the singles title.

Finals

Singles

 Marc Rosset defeated  Jan Siemerink 6–2, 7–6(7–1)
 It was Rosset's 1st title of the year and the 10th of his career.

Doubles

 Arnaud Boetsch /  Olivier Delaître defeated  Ivan Lendl /  Christo van Rensburg 6–3, 7–6
 It was Boetsch's 1st title of the year and the 2nd of his career. It was Delaître's 2nd title of the year and the 5th of his career.

References

External links
 ITF tournament edition details

Open 13
Open 13
Carpet court tennis tournaments
Open 13